Dowster or DJ Dowster, also known as David Thomas, (born 1 March 1971 in Newport, South Wales), is a Welsh record producer, singer-songwriter and disc jockey from Cwmbran in South Wales.  David has been involved in the rave scene since 1998 and his love of the music lead him to begin his DJ career in 
In 2001, Dowster was signed to Raver Baby Records by its owner DJ Hixxy (born Ian Hicks) to become part of the original Raver Baby Collective.  This collective, known at the time as the RBC, included some of the UK Hardcore scene's leading DJs and MCs – Hixxy, Breeze, Darren Styles, UFO, MC Storm and MC Whizzkid.  In addition to his DJ bookings and single releases within this period, Dowster's solo and collaborative studio projects can be found on certain volumes of the highly successful Bonkers series as well as other leading names in UK hardcore compilation albums. Three of his most popular tracks were "Starlight", "Steps Ahead" and "Here We Go".

Dowster's recent solo projects and collaborations with Vagabond have been receiving support from Kutski on BBC Radio 1, with tracks such as "Bionix" and "Jungle Juice" getting airplay on Kutski's weekly show.  Dowster is a featured artist on the Radio 1 website.

Candy Crush Music
In 2008, Dowster founded the UK Hardcore label Candy Crush Music with Alex Bassjunkie, through which a series of collaborations between these two artists were released.  In 2011, full ownership of the label was signed over to Dowster as he began to take the label in a new direction.  The relaunch of Candy Crush Music was in June 2011.  Dowster signed Vagabond (born Sam Thomsitt, previously known as "V.A.G.A.B.O.N.D.", "Euphoria" and "Dreadhed" from his previous work with Next Generation Records and Blatant Beats) to Candy Crush Music in March 2011.  Other established artists with whom Dowster has collaborated for the relaunched Candy Crush Music label include Cat Knight, Mark Breeze, MC Whizzkid, MC Wotsee and MC Enemy.

Music style
Dowster relaunched Candy Crush Music to showcase instrumental and vocal UK Hardcore with all its subgenres including happy hardcore, Dutch Hardcore (also erroneously referred to in the UK as gabba) as well as his own melodic take on the electro and dubstep influenced sound which is being pushed by Darren Styles, Breeze and the latest volume in the successful Clubland X-Treme Hardcore series.

Performance
Dowster's love for DJing and performing has led him to perform at events over the UK, including a main stage live P.A. at Slammin Vinyl in 2005.  Bookings for 2012 include the HTID Weekender along with international gigs such as "Best of UK Happy Hardcore – Convention Concepts Showcase" in (Germany).

References

External links

Soundcloud

1977 births
Living people
Welsh DJs